The 2012 Superstars Series season was the ninth year of the Superstars Series, an Italian-based touring car racing series, featuring the ninth edition of the Campionato Italiano Superstars (Italian Superstars Championship) and the sixth year of the International Superstars Series. The season began at Monza on April 1 and finished at Pergusa on October 28, after eighth round. A ninth round was planned at Sentul but it was cancelled.

All eight rounds counted towards the International title, with five rounds counting towards the Italian title. Both championship were won by Johan Kristoffersson driving for Audi.

Teams and drivers
 All teams use Hankook tyres.

Changes
ROAL Motorsport (Team BMW Italia) retired from the series at the end of 2011; for 2012 it provided technical support to the new team Dinamic.
Swiss-based Solaris Motorsport took over the Chevrolet Lumina program left by Motorzone Race Car.
Audi Sport Italia developed the new Audi RS5 racer, fielding one car and providing support for two private teams: Swedish team Kristoffersson Motorsport (racing as Audi Sport KMS) and German team MTM Motorsport.
San Marino based W&D Racing Team joined the series with two BMW M3 (E90).
Starting mid-season, Roma Racing Team fielded a brand-new Superstars racing car, the Mercedes C63 AMG Coupé developed by Top Run Engineering.
Spain-based Campos Racing retired from the series.

Calendar

Results

Championship standings
Scoring system

Campionato Italiano Superstars

International Superstars Series – Drivers

International Superstars Series – Teams

References

External links
Official Superstars website

Superstars Series
Superstars Series seasons